The Chinese Wikipedia is the written vernacular Chinese (a form of Mandarin Chinese) edition of Wikipedia. It is run by the Wikimedia Foundation. Started on 11 May 2001, the Chinese Wikipedia currently has  articles and  registered users, of whom  have administrative privileges.

The Chinese Wikipedia has been blocked in mainland China since May 2015. Despite the block in China, it is still one of the ten most active language versions of Wikipedia (and it has the eighth-highest number of active users as of August 2021) due to contributions from users from Taiwan, Hong Kong, Macau, Singapore, Malaysia, and the large Chinese diaspora.

Taiwan and Hong Kong contribute most of the page views of the Chinese Wikipedia.

History 

The Chinese Wikipedia was established along with 12 other Wikipedias in May 2001. At the beginning, however, the Chinese Wikipedia did not support Chinese characters, and had no encyclopedic content.

In October 2002, the first Chinese-language page was written, the Main Page. A software update on 27 October 2002 allowed Chinese language input. The domain was set to be zh.wikipedia.org, with zh based on the ISO code for the Chinese language. On 17 November 2002, the user Mountain translated the Computer science article into :zh:计算机科学, thus creating its first real encyclopedic article.

In order to accommodate the orthographic differences between simplified Chinese characters and traditional Chinese characters (or Orthodox Chinese), from 2002 to 2003, the Chinese Wikipedia community gradually decided to combine the two originally separate versions of the Chinese Wikipedia. The first running automatic conversion between the two orthographic representations started on 23 December 2004, with the MediaWiki 1.4 release. The needs from Hong Kong and Singapore were taken into account in the MediaWiki 1.4.2 release, which made the conversion table for zh-sg default to zh-cn, and zh-hk default to zh-tw.

In its early days, most articles on the Chinese Wikipedia were translated from the English version. The first five sysops, or administrators, were promoted on 14 June 2003.

Wikipedia was first introduced by the mainland Chinese media in the newspaper China Computer Education on 20 October 2003, in the article, "I join to write an encyclopedia". On 16 May 2004, Wikipedia was first reported by Taiwanese media in the newspaper China Times. Since then, many newspapers have published articles about the Chinese Wikipedia, and several sysops have been interviewed by journalists.

Ivan Zhai of the South China Morning Post wrote that the blocks from the mainland authorities in the 2000s stifled the growth of the Chinese Wikipedia, and that by 2013 there was a new generation of users originating from the Mainland who were taking efforts to make the Chinese Wikipedia grow. In 2013, there were 1.4 million registered users on the Chinese Wikipedia, and in July 2013 7,500 of these users were active, with most of them originating from Hong Kong and Taiwan. There are 715,000 entries for the Chinese Wikipedia, making it the 12th largest Wikipedia.

Naming 

The Chinese name of Wikipedia was decided on 21 October 2003, following a vote. The name means "Wiki Encyclopedia". The name can be interpreted as 'the encyclopedia that connects the fundamental knowledge of humanity'.

As a result, the term  has become associated exclusively with Wikimedia projects.

The Chinese Wikipedia also has a sub header: , which means, "The sea encompasses hundreds of rivers/all rivers will eventually flow into the sea; it has capacity i.e. is willing to accept all and is thus great." The sub header originated from the first half of a couplet composed by the Qing Dynasty official Lin Zexu.

Community 

According to Wikimedia Statistics, in January 2021, the majority of viewers and editors on the Chinese Wikipedia were from Taiwan and Hong Kong. Numerous viewers and users are from Macau, Singapore, Malaysia, United States and other countries with a high Chinese diaspora; but there are some viewers from China as well.

In April 2016, the project had 2,127 active editors who made at least five edits in that month.

The most discussed and debated topics on the Chinese Wikipedia are political issues in Chinese modern history. For example, the six most edited articles as of August 2007 were Taiwan, Chinese culture, China, Mao Zedong, Chiang Kai-shek, and Hong Kong, in that order. In contrast, issues such as the Israeli–Palestinian conflict are much less contentious.

Due to the audience base, Wikipedians from China, Taiwan, and other regions had engaged in editing conflicts over political topics related to Cross-Straits relations. Due to the censorship in mainland China, Chinese Wikipedia's audience comes primarily from Taiwan, Hong Kong, Macau, Singapore and the diasporas in Malaysia, the United States, Canada, Australia, South Korea (including Koreans from China), totaling approximately 60 million people. Chinese Wikipedia has more than 9,100 active users as of July 2021, and this number is increasing.

Approximately half of Chinese Wikipedia's 610 million pageviews monthly come from Taiwan, with approximately one 20% coming from Hong Kong, one 8% from United States, one 4% from Malaysia and the rest from Singapore, Macau, Mainland China and the Chinese diaspora. In 2021, the monthly pageviews of Chinese Wikipedia underwent a spike in growth from around 380 million to 620 million pageviews in six months.

Administrators 
As of June 2019, there are 78 administrators, or sysops. They are all elected by Chinese Wikipedians. Most of them come from Mainland China, Hong Kong and Taiwan. There are also a few who come from the United States, Singapore, and Japan.

Meetings 

The first Chinese Wikipedian meeting was held in Beijing on 25 July 2004. Since then, Chinese Wikipedians from different regions have held many gatherings in Beijing, Shanghai, Dalian, Shenyang, Guangdong, Hong Kong, and Taiwan. Currently, a regular meetup is held once every two weeks in Shanghai, Taipei and Hong Kong, and once every month in Tainan City, Taiwan. In July 2006, Taiwanese Wikipedians also held a "travelling meetup", travelling by train through four Taiwanese cities over a period of two days. In August 2006, Hong Kong hosted the first annual Chinese Wikimedia Conference.

Chinese Wikipedians advertise Wikipedia in different ways. Many of them use Weibo, a Chinese socializing website similar to Twitter. Several Chinese Wikipedians created the Wikipedia monthly magazine, or journal, called "The Wikipedians" in December 2012, which is currently published once a month.

State persecution of volunteers 
Chinese Wikipedia volunteers who edit on topics considered controversial by the state authorities, such as about Hong Kong protests, can face harassment and persecution.

Automatic conversion between traditional and simplified Chinese characters

Original situation 
Originally, there were virtually two Chinese Wikipedias under the names of "zh" (or "zh-cn") and "zh-tw". Generally, users from regions that used Traditional Chinese characters (such as Taiwan, Hong Kong, and Macau) wrote and edited articles using Traditional Chinese characters whereas those from regions that used Simplified Chinese characters (such as mainland China, Singapore, and Malaysia) wrote using Simplified Chinese characters. Many articles had two uncoordinated versions; for example, there was both a Traditional (法國) and Simplified (法国) article on France. Further exacerbating the problem were differences in vocabulary (particularly nouns) and writing systems, between mainland China, Taiwan, Hong Kong, and Singapore.

Solution 
To avoid this near-forking of the project, starting around January 2005, the Chinese Wikipedia began providing a server-side mechanism to automatically convert different characters and vocabulary items into the user's local ones, according to the user's preference settings, which may be set to one of two settings that convert the script only, or one of six settings that also take into account regional vocabulary differences:

Conversion is done through a set of character conversion tables that may be edited by administrators. To provide an alternative means to harmonize the characters when the server-side converters fail to work properly, a special template was created to manually convert characters and article titles in one specific page.

Furthermore, page title conversion is used for automatic page redirection. Those articles previously named in different characters or different translations have been merged, and can be reached by means of both Traditional and Simplified Chinese titles.

Differences with other versions of Wikipedia 
According to a survey conducted between April 2010 and March 2011, edits to the Chinese Wikipedia were 37.8 per cent from Taiwan, 26.2 per cent from Hong Kong, 17.7 per cent from mainland China, 6.1 per cent from United States, and 2.3 per cent from Canada.

Many editing controversies arise from current and historical political events in Chinese-speaking regions, such as the political status of Taiwan, independent movement and autonomy movement of Hong Kong, Anti-Extradition Law Amendment Bill Movement, 1989 Tiananmen Square protests and massacre, issues of the Chinese Communist Party and Kuomintang.

Wikipedia in other varieties of Chinese 

The Chinese Wikipedia is based on written vernacular Chinese, the official Chinese written language in all Chinese-speaking regions, including mainland China, Taiwan, Hong Kong, Macau, and Singapore. This register is largely associated with the grammar and vocabulary of Standard Chinese, the official spoken language of mainland China, Taiwan, and Singapore (but not exclusively of Hong Kong and Macau, which largely use Cantonese).

The varieties of Chinese are a diverse group encompassing many regional topolects, most of which are mutually unintelligible and often divided up into several larger dialect groups, such as Wu (including Shanghainese and Suzhounese), Min Nan (of which Taiwanese is a notable dialect), and Cantonese. In regions that speak non-Mandarin languages or regional Mandarin dialects, the Vernacular Chinese standard largely corresponding to Standard Chinese is nevertheless used exclusively as the Chinese written standard; this written standard differs sharply from the local dialects in vocabulary and grammar, and is often read in local pronunciation but preserving the vocabulary and grammar of Standard Chinese. After the founding of Wikipedia, many users of non-Mandarin Chinese varieties began to ask for the right to have Wikipedia editions in non-Mandarin varieties as well. However, they also met with significant opposition, based on the fact that Mandarin-based Vernacular Chinese is the only form used in scholarly or academic contexts. Some also proposed the implementation of an automatic conversion program similar to that between Simplified and Traditional Chinese; however, others pointed out that although conversion between Simplified and Traditional Chinese consists mainly of glyph and sometimes vocabulary substitutions, different regional varieties of Chinese differ so sharply in grammar, syntax, and semantics that it was unrealistic to implement an automatic conversion program.

Objections notwithstanding, it was determined that these Chinese varieties were sufficiently different from Standard Chinese and had a sufficiently large number of followers to justify the creation of six Wikipedias for different varieties.

Finally, requests were also made, and granted, to create a Classical Chinese Wikipedia (:zh-classical:), based on Classical Chinese, an archaic register of Chinese with grammar and vocabulary drawn from classical works and used in all official contexts until the early 20th century, when it was displaced by the Vernacular Chinese standard.

All of the above Wikipedias have sidestepped the Traditional/Simplified Chinese issue. The Wu Wikipedia uses Simplified Chinese exclusively, and the Classical Chinese Wikipedia uses Traditional Chinese exclusively (The Gan and Cantonese Wikipedias default to Traditional, but have a conversion function similar to the Chinese Wikipedia). The Min Nan Wikipedia uses Pe̍h-ōe-jī. The Mindong Wikipedia and Hakka Wikipedias currently use Bàng-uâ-cê and Pha̍k-fa-sṳ respectively, which can be converted to Traditional Chinese characters, thus avoiding the issue completely.

2021 Wikimedia action

Wikimedia revoked access of seven editors and downgraded the privileges of 12 Mainland-based administrators on 16 September 2021 over "infiltration concerns." It was alleged that an unrecognized group of Mainland China editors, with approximately three hundred members, had been involved in vote-stacking and manipulation of administrative elections. The Wikimedia Foundation said that they took action based on  "credible threats” to volunteer safety. Several of the affected members denied wrongdoing in subsequent interviews and writings. The affair caused significant controversy on Chinese Wikipedia, and also drew critical commentary from Chinese media, where Wikipedia is rarely discussed.

Blocking of Wikipedia 

The People's Republic of China and internet service providers in Mainland China have adopted a practice of blocking contentious Internet sites in mainland China, and Wikimedia sites have been blocked at least three times in its history.

On 19 May 2015, Chinese Wikipedia was blocked again within mainland China. Because all Wikipedias rely on HTTPS links, Chinese censors cannot see what page an individual is viewing; this also makes it more difficult to block a specific set of pages.

First block 
The first block lasted from 2 – 21 June 2004. It began when access to the Chinese Wikipedia from Beijing was blocked on the 15th anniversary of the 1989 Tiananmen Square protests.

Possibly related to this, on 31 May an article from the IDG News Service was published, discussing the Chinese Wikipedia's treatment of the protests. The Chinese Wikipedia also has articles related to Taiwan independence, written by contributors from Taiwan and elsewhere. A few days after the initial block of the Chinese Wikipedia, all Wikimedia Foundation sites were blocked in mainland China. In response to the blocks, two moderators prepared an appeal to lift the block and asked their regional internet service provider to submit it. All Wikimedia sites were unblocked between 17 and 21 June 2004. One month later, the first Chinese Wikipedian moderators' meeting was held in Beijing on 25 July 2004.

The first block had an effect on the vitality of the Chinese Wikipedia, which suffered sharp dips in various indicators, such as the number of new users, the number of new articles, and the number of edits. In some cases, it took anywhere from 6 to 12 months in order to regain the stats from May 2004. On the other hand, on today's site, some of the articles are put under protection which may last for a month or more without any actions.

Second block 
The second and less serious outage lasted between 23 and 27 September 2004. During this four-day period, access to Wikipedia was erratic or unavailable to some users in mainland China – this block was not comprehensive and some users in mainland China were never affected. The exact reason for the block is a mystery. Chinese Wikipedians once again prepared a written appeal to regional ISPs, but the block was lifted before the appeal was actually sent, for an unknown reason.

Third block and temporary unblocks 
The third block began on 19 October 2005, and there was no indication as to whether this block was temporary or permanent, or what the reasons or causes for this block were. According to the status page currently maintained on the Chinese Wikipedia, the Florida and Korea servers were blocked, whereas the Paris and Amsterdam servers were not. Dozens of editors from across mainland China reported that they could only access Wikipedia using proxy servers, although there were isolated reports that some users could access Wikipedia without using a proxy. Most Chinese people were not able to connect to the site at all.

During October and November 2006, it first appeared that the site was unblocked again. Many conflicting reports came from news outlets, bloggers, and Wikipedians, reporting a possible partial or full unblocking of Wikipedia. Some reports indicated a complete unblock; others suggested that some sensitive topics remained blocked, and yet others suggested that the Chinese Wikipedia was blocked whereas other-language versions were not. From 17 November onwards, the complete block was once again in place.

On 15 June 2007, China lifted the block for several articles, only to then block an increasing number of articles. On 30 August 2007, all blocks were lifted, but then a block was placed on Wikipedia for all languages on 31 August 2007. As of 26 January 2008, all languages of Wikipedia were blocked, and as of 2 April 2008, the block was lifted.

By 5 April 2008, the Chinese Wikipedia became difficult to access from the Sun Yat-Sen University in Guangzhou. Connections to the Chinese Wikipedia were completely blocked as of 6 April 2008. Any attempt to access the Chinese Wikipedia resulted in a 60-second ban on all Wikimedia websites. However, users were able to log on to the Chinese Wikipedia using https. All other languages were accessible, but politically sensitive searches such as Tibet were still blocked.

On 3 July 2008, the government lifted the ban on accessing the Chinese Wikipedia. However, some parts were still inaccessible. On 31 July 2008, BBC reported that the Chinese Wikipedia had been unblocked that day in China; it had still been blocked the previous day. This came within the context of foreign journalists arriving in Beijing to report on the upcoming Olympic Games, and websites like the Chinese edition of the BBC were being unblocked following talks between the International Olympic Committee and the Games' Chinese organizers.

Fourth block 

On 19 May 2015, both the encrypted and unencrypted Chinese-language versions of Wikipedia were blocked.

Fifth block 
On 23 April 2019, all versions of Wikipedia were blocked in China.

Controversy and criticism

2006 allegations of self-censorship 

In December 2006, the International Herald Tribune Asia-Pacific published an article saying that sensitive topics received subdued treatment on the Chinese Wikipedia.

On 1 December 2006, The New York Times published another report by Howard W. French, titled "Wikipedia lays bare two versions of China's past."

The report was subsequently repeated by CBS and by Chinese-language media outlets such as the Apple Daily in Taiwan.

Some Chinese Wikipedians then tried to clarify the situation. One Chinese Wikipedian sent a comment that was subsequently published in the Apple Daily in Taiwan. The comment stated:

In another email addressed to the Wikimedia Foundation mailing list, a Chinese Wikipedian stated:

Previous proposals to self-censor the Chinese Wikipedia in light of the P. R. Chinese government's censorship policies have been made before, but were overwhelmingly rejected by the community.

2010 Administrator Controversy 
In April 2010, Hong Kong newspaper Ming Pao reported the large-scale censorship of contents about 1989 Tiananmen Square protests and massacre and Hong Kong related contents in which an administrator named "Shizhao" ("百無一用是書生" a.k.a. "時昭") was involved. The report also mentioned the failed recall of the administrator.

In a follow-up, Ming Pao interviewed Shizhao and stated that he was not a member of the 50 Cent Party. He added that for controversial topics such as the 1989 protests, he should be a little more cautious. In the interview, he denied that he had attempted to delete an article about the Concert For Democracy in China (民主歌聲獻中華), and stated that he merely questioned the notability of the concert by adding a template to the article.

However, he had started a vote to delete an article about a song criticizing the Hong Kong government in 2007, enraging many Hong Kong netizens. Shizhao added that, at the time, he had already edited more than 50,000 times, deleting several articles including Manual for Librarians. He joked about the incident, saying, "some may consider that is a kind of hate to libraries and hence is not suitable for monitoring Wikipedia."

Allegations of bias against the Chinese Government 
Some Chinese officials and scholars have accused Chinese Wikipedia of having serious anti-Chinese government bias. Chinese academics Li-hao Gan and Bin-Ting Weng published a paper titled "Opportunities And Challenges Of China's Foreign Communication in the Wikipedia", in which they argue that "due to the influence by foreign media, Wikipedia entries have a large number of prejudiced words against the Chinese government". Jie Ding, an official from the China International Publishing Group, also published an article stated that " there is a lack of systematic ordering and maintenance of contents about China's major political discourse on Wikipedia". He also urged Wikipedia to reflect the voices and views of the Chinese government in an objective way. Lokman Tsui, an assistant professor at the School of Journalism and Communication at the Chinese University of Hong Kong, said in an interview with the BBC that " there a lot of misunderstandings about China abroad "

In October 2021, WMF's application to become an observer at the World Intellectual Property Organization (WIPO) was blocked by the government of China over the existence of a Wikimedia Foundation affiliate in Taiwan and accusation of "Anti-China false information".

Enming Yan, a former administrator of the Chinese Wikipedia, said in an interview with BBC that "You're removing pro-Beijing voices and so the balance is going to tilt towards anti-Beijing forces within Wikipedia." However, Wikipedia's founder, Jimmy Wales, notes that the principles of freedom of expression and neutrality apply globally to Wikipedia. Wales said "I have deep experience of talking to people all over the world, and the idea that people in China, for example, are so brainwashed that they can't see that neutrality is just false."

VPN exemptions 
Despite being censored in mainland China, and as VPNs are normally not allowed to edit Wikipedia, Wikipedia administrators from China have permitted IP block exemption for a select number of mainland users. According to the Slate, "one former Chinese Wikipedia editor told me that over the past few years there has been a “defection” of volunteer editors leaving Baidu Baike to join Chinese Wikipedia because the contributors wanted the privilege of working on a higher-quality internet encyclopedia—one that also carries a great deal of international power."

Wikimedia Foundation banned members from affiliated group 
The WMC has threatened to report Wikipedia editors to Hong Kong’s national security police hotline over the disputed article "2019–2020 Hong Kong protests" characterized by edit warring.  A Hong Kong-based editor, who remains anonymous because of fears of intimidation, noted that "Pro-Beijing people often remove content that is sympathetic to protests, such as tear gas being fired and images of barricades. They also add their own content". Acknowledging that "edit wars" happen on both sides, the anonymous editor stated that "Pro-democracy editors tend to add content to shift the balance or the tone of the article, but in my experience, the pro-Beijing editors are a lot more aggressive in churning out disinformation. It's now unfixable without external interference. Someone is trying to rewrite history."

Competitors 
On 20 April 2006, the online Chinese search engine company Baidu created Baidu Baike, an online encyclopedia that registered users can edit, pending administrator reviews. The content of the encyclopedia is self-censored in accordance with the regulations of the People's Republic of China government. Within weeks, the number of articles in Baidu Baike had surpassed that of the Chinese Wikipedia. However, Baidu Baike has long been accused of copying and reproducing articles from Chinese Wikipedia.

As of October 2009, Hudong Wiki surpassed Baidu Baike as China's largest online encyclopedia in terms of number of articles it owns. Hudong has since been renamed to Baike, not to be confused with Baidu Baike.

Baidu Baike and Hudong are both commercial products. Whereas the Chinese Wikipedia is released under the GNU Free Documentation License, Baidu Baike and Hudong are fully copyrighted by their ownership; contributors forfeit all rights upon submission. However, Baidu Baike has been accused of "widespread copyright infringement" by mass-copying Wikipedia pages and incorporating them into Baidu Baike pages since 2007.

See also 

 
 Internet censorship in the People's Republic of China
 Politics of the People's Republic of China
 Golden Shield Project
 Chinese encyclopedias
 List of Wikipedias
 The Signpost, 26 September 2021
 Zhemao hoaxes

References

External links 

 Chinese Wikipedia 
 
 
 Chinese Wikimedia Conference 2006
 Liao, Tan-Heng. "Wikipedia in mainland China: the critical years of 2005-2008." ’Oxford Internet Suite'’'. Oxford University.
 Woo, Eva. "China, Wikipedia, and Censorship's Perils." BusinessWeek''. 20 October 2007.

Internet properties established in 2001
Wikipedias by language
Chinese online encyclopedias
Articles containing video clips